RGA may refer to:

 Hermes Quijada International Airport in Río Grande, Tierra del Fuego Province, Argentina (IATA code)
 R/GA, an international advertising agency
 Reallexikon der germanischen Altertumskunde. a German-language encyclopedia of the history of the Germanic peoples
 Red-Green Alliance (Denmark), a far left-wing political party in Denmark
 Reinsurance Group of America, a reinsurance company
 Relative Gain Array, a tool to determine optimal input-output pairings for MIMO systems
 Republican Governors Association, an association for governors in the United States who belong to the United States Republican Party
 Residual gas analyzer, a small mass spectrometer
 Restricted Growth Association, a UK charity that supports people with dwarfism
 Return Goods Authorization, returning goods to the supplier for repair or replacement
 Rezerva generală a aviației, the General Aviation Reserve of Romania which operated between 1916 and 1919.
 Roller Girls of the Apocalypse, a roller derby league based in Kaiserslautern, Germany
 Royal Garrison Artillery, a pre-1930 corps of the British Army